The Maud and Belle Ainsworth House is a historic house located in the Southwest Hills neighborhood of Portland, Oregon.  It is listed on the National Register of Historic Places.

Maud Ainsworth was a prominent Northwest photographer in a cutting-edge, modernist style. The 1907 Arts and Crafts house she shared with her sister Belle included her studio and darkroom. The sisters were the two youngest daughters of pioneer businessman and steamboat owner John C. Ainsworth. Belle Ainsworth, under her married name of Jenkins, is also associated with the National Register listed Jenkins Estate in nearby Washington County.

The house is a defining work of architect William C. Knighton, a designer of importance throughout Oregon.

See also
National Register of Historic Places listings in Southwest Portland, Oregon
Capt. John C. Ainsworth House

References

External links

Houses on the National Register of Historic Places in Portland, Oregon
Houses completed in 1907
Arts and Crafts architecture in Oregon
1907 establishments in Oregon
Southwest Hills, Portland, Oregon
Portland Historic Landmarks